Karl John Rubke (December 6, 1935April 27, 2009) was a professional American football center and linebacker in the National Football League (NFL) and the American Football League (AFL).

College career
He played college football at the University of Southern California.

Professional career
Rubke was drafted by the San Francisco 49ers in the 5th round (56th overall) of the 1957 NFL Draft. He played for the NFL's 49ers (1957–1960, 1962–1965), the Minnesota Vikings (1961), the Atlanta Falcons (1966–1967), and the AFL's Oakland Raiders (1968)

See also
Other American Football League players

External links
Obituary

1935 births
2009 deaths
Players of American football from Los Angeles
American football centers
American football linebackers
USC Trojans football players
San Francisco 49ers players
Minnesota Vikings players
Atlanta Falcons players
Oakland Raiders players
American Football League players